These are the results of the men's floor competition, one of eight events for male competitors in artistic gymnastics at the 1984 Summer Olympics in Los Angeles.  The qualification and final rounds took place on July 29, 31 and August 4 at UCLA’s Pauley Pavilion.

Medalists

Results
Seventy-one gymnasts competed in the compulsory and optional rounds on July 29 and 31.  The eight highest scoring gymnasts advanced to the final on August 4.  Each country was limited to two competitors in the final.  Half of the points earned by each gymnast during both the compulsory and optional rounds carried over to the final.  This constitutes the "prelim" score.

References
Official Olympic Report
www.gymnasticsresults.com
www.gymn-forum.net

Men's floor
Men's events at the 1984 Summer Olympics